The 2021 Tour de l'Ain was a men's road cycling stage race that took place from 29 to 31 July 2021 in the French department of Ain. It was the 33rd edition of the Tour de l'Ain, which was a 2.1 event on the 2021 UCI Europe Tour calendar.

Teams 
Eight of the nineteen UCI WorldTeams, eight UCI ProTeams, three UCI Continental teams, and two national teams made up the twenty-one teams that participated in the race. With five riders,  was the only team to not enter a full squad of six riders. Of the 125 riders who started the race, 104 finished.

UCI WorldTeams

 
 
 
 
 
 
 
 

UCI ProTeams

 
 
 
 
 
 
 
 

UCI Continental Teams

 
 
 

National Teams

 France
 Germany U–23

Route

Stages

Stage 1 
29 July 2021 – Parc des Oiseaux to Bourg-en-Bresse,

Stage 2 
30 July 2021 – Lagnieu to Saint-Vulbas,

Stage 3 
31 July 2021 – Izernore to Lélex Monts-Jura,

Classification leadership 

 On stage 2, Nacer Bouhanni, who was second in the points classification, wore the green jersey, because first placed Álvaro Hodeg wore the yellow jersey as the leader of the general classification.
 On stage 3, Álvaro Hodeg, who was second in the points classification, wore the green jersey, because first placed Georg Zimmermann wore the yellow jersey as the leader of the general classification.

Final classification standings

General classification

Points classification

Mountains classification

Young rider classification

Team classification

References 

2021 UCI Europe Tour
2021 in French sport
July 2021 sports events in France